The 1974–75 Ronchetti Cup was the fourth edition of FIBA's second-tier competition for European women's basketball clubs, previously named FIBA Women's European Cup Winners' Cup. It was renamed in memory of Italian player Liliana Ronchetti, who had died in February 1974 of cancer at the age of 26. It was contested by 30 teams from 15 countries, 17 more contestants than in the previous season, with Austria, Sweden and Switzerland making their debut, and so three qualifying rounds were held instead of two. Spartak Leningrad, which had already dominated the Cup Winners' Cup, defeated Levski-Spartak Sofia in the final to win its fourth title in a row.

First qualifying round

Second qualifying round

Third qualifying round

Group stage

Group A

Group B

Semifinals

Final

References

1974-75
1974–75 in European women's basketball